Firebombing is a bombing technique designed to damage a target, generally an urban area, through the use of fire, caused by incendiary devices, rather than from the blast effect of large bombs.

In popular usage, any act in which an incendiary device is used to initiate a fire is often described as a "firebombing". This article is concerned with aerial incendiary bombing as a military tactic; for non-military (almost always criminal) acts, see arson.

Although simple incendiary bombs have been used to destroy buildings since the start of gunpowder warfare, World War I saw the first use of strategic bombing from the air to damage the morale and economy of the enemy, such as the German Zeppelin air raids conducted on London during the Great War. The Chinese wartime capital of Chongqing was firebombed by the Imperial Japanese starting in early 1939. London, Coventry, and many other British cities were firebombed during the Blitz by Germany. Most large German cities were extensively firebombed starting in 1942, and almost all large Japanese cities were firebombed during the last six months of World War II.

This technique makes use of small incendiary bombs (possibly delivered by a cluster bomb such as the Molotov bread basket). If a fire catches, it could spread, taking in adjacent buildings that would have been largely unaffected by a high explosive bomb. This is a more effective use of the payload that a bomber could carry.

The use of incendiaries alone does not generally start uncontrollable fires where the targets are roofed with nonflammable materials such as tiles or slates. The use of a mixture of bombers carrying high explosive bombs, such as the British blockbuster bombs, which blew out windows and roofs and exposed the interior of buildings to the incendiary bombs, is much more effective. Alternatively, a preliminary bombing with conventional bombs can be followed by subsequent attacks by incendiary carrying bombers.

Tactics

Early in World War II many British cities were firebombed. Two particularly notable raids were the Coventry Blitz on 14 November 1940, and the blitz on London on the night of 29 December/30 December 1940, which was the most destructive raid on London during the war with much of the destruction caused by fires started by incendiary bombs. During the Coventry Blitz the Germans pioneered several innovations which were to influence all future strategic bomber raids during the war. These were: the use of pathfinder aircraft with electronic aids to navigate, to mark the targets before the main bomber raid; and the use of high explosive bombs and air-mines coupled with thousands of incendiary bombs intended to set the city ablaze. The first wave of follow-up bombers dropped high explosive bombs, the intent of which was to knock out the utilities (the water supply, electricity network and gas mains), and to crater the road — making it difficult for the fire engines to reach fires started by the successive waves of bombers. The follow-up waves dropped a combination of high explosive and incendiary bombs. There were two types of incendiary bombs: those made of magnesium and iron powders, and those made of petroleum. The high-explosive bombs and the larger air-mines were not only designed to hamper the Coventry fire brigade, they were also intended to damage roofs, making it easier for the incendiary bombs to fall into buildings and ignite them. As Sir Arthur Harris, commander of RAF Bomber Command, wrote after the war:

The tactical innovation of the bomber stream was developed by the RAF to overwhelm the German aerial defenses of the Kammhuber Line during World War II to increase the RAF's concentration in time over the target.  But after the lessons learned during the Blitz, the tactic of dropping a high concentration of bombs over the target in the shortest time possible became standard in the RAF as it was more effective than a longer raid. For example, during the Coventry Blitz on the night of 14/15 November 1940, 515 Luftwaffe bombers, many flying more than one sortie against Coventry, delivered their bombs over a period of time lasting more than 10 hours.  In contrast, the much more devastating raid on Dresden on the night of 13/14 of February 1945 by two waves of the RAF Bomber Command's main force, involved their bombs being released at 22:14, with all but one of the 254 Lancaster bombers releasing their bombs within two minutes, and the last one released at 22:22.  The second wave of 529 Lancasters dropped all of their bombs between 01:21 and 01:45. This means that in the first raid, on average, one Lancaster dropped a full load of bombs every half a second and in the second larger raid that involved more than one RAF bomber Group, one every three seconds.

The United States Army Air Forces (USAAF) officially only bombed precision targets over Europe, but for example, when 316 B-17 Flying Fortresses bombed Dresden in a follow-up raid at around noon on 14 February 1945, because of clouds the later waves bombed using H2X radar for targeting. The mix of bombs to be used on the Dresden raid was about 40% incendiaries, much closer to the RAF city-busting mix than the bomb-load usually used by the Americans in precision bombardments. This was quite a common mix when the USAAF anticipated cloudy conditions over the target.

In its attacks on Japan, the USAAF abandoned its precision bombing method that was used in Europe before and adopted a policy of saturation bombing, using incendiaries to burn Japanese-held cities including Wuhan, and the cities of the Japanese home islands. These tactics were used to devastating effect with many urban areas burned out. A lesser number of M-47 incendiaries was dropped: the M-47 was a  jelled-gasoline and white phosphorus bomb which ignited upon impact. In the first two hours of the raid, 226 of the attacking aircraft or 81% unloaded their bombs to overwhelm the city's fire defenses. The first to arrive dropped bombs in a large X pattern centered in Tokyo's working class district near the docks; later aircraft simply aimed near this flaming X. Approximately  of the city were destroyed and 100,000 people are estimated to have died in the resulting conflagration, more than the immediate deaths of either the atomic bombings of Hiroshima or Nagasaki. After this raid, the USAAF continued with low-altitude incendiary raids against Japan's cities, destroying an average of 40% of the built-up area of 64 of the largest cities.

Popular culture
 The 1967 semi-autobiographical short story Grave of the Fireflies follows events after the firebombing of Kobe. It was eventually adapted into a 1988 film of the same name.
The middle portion of historical fantasy novel Teito Monogatari, is set during the period of the Allied firebombings in Japan.  This section of the novel was eventually adapted into the film Tokyo: The Last War.
 Kurt Vonnegut's science fiction novel Slaughterhouse-Five is partially based on his personal experience of the Dresden firestorm.
 The novel Extremely Loud and Incredibly Close by Jonathan Safran Foer contains narrative threads dealing with the Bombing of Dresden.

See also
German Village (Dugway proving ground)
Japanese Village (Dugway Proving Ground)
Sir Arthur Harris, 1st Baronet
General Curtis E. LeMay, USAF
Bombing of Hamburg in World War II
Bombing of Dresden in World War II
Bombing of London in World War II
Bombing of Coventry in World War II
Bombing of Tokyo in World War II
Bombing of Frampol in World War II
Bombing of Wieluń in World War II
Bombing of Warsaw in World War II
Aerial bombing of cities
Roerich Pact

Notes

References
Davis, Richard G.  Bombing the European Axis Powers. A Historical Digest of the Combined Bomber Offensive 1939–1945 PDF. Alabama: Air University Press, 2006
Harris, Arthur. Bomber Offensive, (First edition Collins 1947), Pen & Sword military classics 2005; .
Taylor, Fredrick; Dresden Tuesday 13 February 1945, Pub Bloomsbury (First Pub 2004, Paper Back 2005). .

Aerial bombing
Aerial warfare strategy
Incendiary weapons